Kozdere, historically İntilli, is a village in the İslahiye District, Gaziantep Province, Turkey. The village is populated by Kurds and had a population of 810 in 2022.

References

Villages in İslahiye District
Kurdish settlements in Gaziantep Province